Charmy may refer to:

 Émilie Charmy (1878–1974), artist in France's early avant-garde
 Charmy Kaur (born 1987), Indian film actress predominantly appearing in Telugu films
 Rika Ishikawa (born 1985), Japanese pop singer and TV/radio hostess
 Charmy Bee, a character in the Sonic the Hedgehog video game series
 Charmy Papittoson, a character in the manga series Black Clover

See also

Charly (name)